Robert Cox (April 30, 1813June 1890) was a Michigan politician.

Early life
Cox was born on April 30, 1813, in the North Branch section of Branchburg, New Jersey. When Cox was young, he became a resident of New York. In 1829, Cox moved to Lenawee County, Michigan. In 1834 or 1835, he moved onto a farm in Wheatland Township, Hillsdale County, Michigan. Cox set out one of the first orchards in Wheatland Township, along with Harvey McGee and Lyman Pease. When Hunter Smith put a press into operation in Pittsford, Michigan, Cox and Zebulon Williams Sr., who also made an early orchard in the township, went and made their apples into cider there.

Career
In 1845, Cox served as a justice of the peace. Before 1854, Cox was a member of the Whig Party. Afterwards, Cox was a Republican. On November 6, 1860, Cox served in the Michigan House of Representatives where he represented the Hillsdale County 3rd district from January 2, 1861 to December 31, 1862. In 1864, Cox served as a Wheatland Township highway commissioner, alongside Perry Knapp and Isaac Gates. In 1865, Cox served as Wheatland Township's sole highway commissioner. In 1868, Cox would again serve as highway commissioner with Perry Knapp. In the years 1870, 1873, and 1876, Cox again served as sole highway commissioner.

Death
Cox died in June 1890 in Wheatland Township.

References

1813 births
1890 deaths
American justices of the peace
Farmers from Michigan
People from Branchburg, New Jersey
People from Hillsdale County, Michigan
Members of the Michigan House of Representatives
Michigan Republicans
Michigan Whigs
19th-century American judges
19th-century American politicians